Gifford is an unincorporated community in southeastern Hardin County, Iowa, United States.  It lies along local roads south of the city of Eldora, the county seat of Hardin County.  Its elevation is 945 feet (288 m).

History
Gifford was laid out in 1875. It was named for C. T. Gifford, who was instrumental in bringing the railroad there. By 1880, Gifford was at junction of two railroads. Gifford's population was 70 in 1902.

Gifford's post office was established on November 9, 1875, and discontinued on February 28, 1907.  Although the post office was reopened on February 17, 1908, it was again discontinued on October 31, 1954, and attached to the Union post office.  Although its post office is gone, Gifford has its own ZIP Code, 50259, even though the ZIP Code system was not implemented until nearly nine years after Gifford's post office was attached to Union's.

References

Unincorporated communities in Hardin County, Iowa
Unincorporated communities in Iowa
Populated places established in 1875
1875 establishments in Iowa